The Battle of Smilevo occurred on 5 August 1903, during the Ilinden Uprising against the Ottoman Empire, in the village of Smilevo, in what is today the south-west of North Macedonia.

Smilevo has a mountainous terrain and a number of forests. The Ottoman forces were unfamiliar with the area and because of the layout or surroundings of the village this went in favour of the local resistance detachments. With the help of a revolutionary leader by the name of Dame Gruev, one of the founders of the Internal Macedonian Revolutionary Organisation (IMRO), the people of the village decided to go ahead with the revolutionary ideas of Dame's work. The Smilevo Congress was also in the process of forming, with the assistance of a number of revolutionary leaders that worked together with Dame Gruev. Boris Sarafov and Atanas Lozanchev had decided to also join the Smilevo Congress to assist with the process of maintaining the set up of the Congress associated with Dame Gruev's workings. The battle saw a Turkish force, withdraw from the village after great losses on the Ottoman side. The rebels achieved a victory. Because of the number of battles lost near the area of Smilevo and Demir Hisar, the Turkish forces had named the area "the iron fortress".

Sources

 MI-AN Publishing, Skopje 1998, Macedonia Yesterday And Today

Macedonia under the Ottoman Empire
1903 in the Ottoman Empire
Internal Macedonian Revolutionary Organization
Smilevo
Smilevo
Military history of North Macedonia
August 1903 events